

Regular season
October 8: Against Minnesota State, Julia Colizza notched three assists.
October 21: Against the Minnesota Golden Gophers women's ice hockey program, Laura Hosier had 33 saves.
November 4: In a match against their CHA rival, the Niagara Purple Eagles women's ice hockey program, Julia Colizza had three assists.
December 4:  Julia Colizza scored a hat trick against the Yale Bulldogs women's ice hockey program
December 10: Valerie Chouinard had three assists against Robert Morris, while Julia Colizza registered a hat trick against the Robert Morris Colonials women's ice hockey program.
January 7: Versus the Connecticut Huskies women's ice hockey, Stephanie Bourbeau scored one goal and two assists
January 8: Against the Providence Friars women's ice hockey, Stephanie Bourbeau notched two goals
January 13: Danielle Lansing had two assists against CHA rival Wayne State
January 21: Danielle Ayearst scored her only goal of the season against CHA rival the Niagara Purple Eagles. It proved to be the game-winning goal.
January 28: Versus the Boston College Eagles, Danielle Lansing had a goal and an assist.
October 8 to October 15: Samantha Shirley had a three-game goal scoring streak
December 9 to January 14: Stephanie Bourbeau had a six-game goal scoring streak
February 24: Valerie Chouinard had three assists versus the Cornell Big Red women's ice hockey team
From November 26 to December 10, Ashley Pendleton scored four goals in five games.

Players
Stefanie Bourbeau appeared in 35 games for the Lakers. Bourbeau accumulated 35 points (17 goals and 18 assists). Her 35 points ranked third, while her assists were fourth overall. Of her 17 goals, five were scored on the power play, two were game-winners, while one was shorthanded. Her plus minus of +26 was good enough for third overall.
Valerie Chouinard led the Lakers in the three major offensive categories: goals (26), assists (25), points (51). In addition, her seven power play goals and six game-winning goals led the team.

Julia Colizza ranked second on the team in all three major offensive categories: 20 goals, 22 assists and 42 points. Her four shorthanded goals led the Lakers. Her plus/minus ranking of +31 led the team. On the power play, she had 10 assists.

Laura Hosier played in 28 games and established herself as the top goaltender. Her goals against average was 1.82 goals while her save percentage was.908.
Stephanie Jones played in 35 games and her 22 assists tied for second on the team. Her 32 points were fourth on the Lakers. Of the 10 goals she notched, one goal was scored on the power play while two were game-winning goals.
Ashley Pendleton appeared in 37 games and accumulated 26 points (10 goals and 16 assists). Of her 26 points, fourteen (five goals and nine assists) were scored on the power play. Her power play points ranked second on the team along with her plus/minus rating of +29.
Samantha Shirley was named the Team captain and played in all 37 games. Her 11 goals ranked fourth while her 26 points ranked fifth on the Lakers. Of her 11 goals, three were game winners.

Player stats

Skaters

Goaltenders

Awards and honors
 Danielle Ayearst, CHA All-Academic Team
 Stephanie Bourbeau, Second Team All-CHA
 Stephanie Bourbeau, All-Tournament Team
 Stephanie Bourbeau, CHA All-Academic Team
Valerie Chouinard, CHA Rookie of the Year
Valerie Chouinard, CHA Player of the Year
Valerie Chouinard, First Team All-CHA
Valerie Chouinard, CHA All-Rookie Team
Valerie Chouinard, CHA Tournament MVP
Valerie Chouinard, Easton Three-Star Player of the Year
Valerie Chouinard, USCHO.com Rookie of the Year
Valerie Chouinard, USCHO.com Second Team
Valerie Chouinard, CHA All-Academic Team
Julia Colizza, Second Team All-CHA
Julia Colizza, CHA All-Tournament Team
Julia Colizza CHA All-Academic Team
Laura Hosier, CHA All-Academic Team 
 Stephanie Jones, Bill Smith Award-Winner
 Stephanie Jones, CHA All-Academic Team
 Stephanie Jones, Frozen Four Skills Challenge Participant
 Danielle Lansing, First Team All-CHA
 Danielle Lansing, CHA All-Tournament Team
 Danielle Lansing, Frozen Four Skills Challenge Alternate
 Danielle Lansing, CHA All-Academic Team
 Danielle Lansing, USCHO.com Second Team
Jill Nugent, CHA All-Academic Team 
Ashley Pendleton, First Team All-CHA

Postseason
Ashley Pendleton had a pair of assists in the CHA semifinal game versus the Robert Morris Colonials. Valerie Chouinard scored a hat trick in CHA semifinals against Robert Morris. In the CHA semifinals versus Robert Morris, Stephanie Bourbeau scored two goals and an assist, while Danielle Ayearst had three assists. Team Captain Samantha Shirley had one goal and one assist.
Julia Colizza scored two goals in the CHA Championship game against Niagara, while Valerie Chouinard scored two goals. Stephanie Bourbeau accumulated four assists in the CHA Championship game. In the Championship Game, Stephanie Jones notched one goal and two assists. Colizza scored Mercyhurst's only goal (shorthanded) in their 2-1 loss to the Wisconsin Badgers in NCAA Regional.

References

External links
Official Site

Mercyhurst
Mercyhurst Lakers women's ice hockey seasons
Mercy
Mercy